Leonardo Rodrigues dos Santos (born 9 December 1998), known as Léo Santos, is a Brazilian professional footballer who plays as a central defender for Ferroviária on loan from Corinthians.

Club career

Early career
Born in São Paulo, Santos started his career when he was 10 years old at Corinthians. He was part of the 2016 Copa São Paulo de Futebol Júnior squad that ended up as runner up.

Corinthians
He made his professional debut as part of the starting team against Figueirense on November 16.

International career
Santos was part of the winning squad of the 2015 South American Under-17 Football Championship. He was also called for the 2015 FIFA U-17 World Cup, despite being an unused substitute in all matches.

Career statistics

Honours
Corinthians
Campeonato Brasileiro Série A: 2017
Campeonato Paulista: 2017, 2018, 2019

Brazil
South American Under-17 Football Championship: 2015

References

External links

1998 births
Living people
Footballers from São Paulo
Brazilian footballers
Brazil youth international footballers
Brazil under-20 international footballers1
Association football defenders
Campeonato Brasileiro Série A players
Campeonato Brasileiro Série B players
Sport Club Corinthians Paulista players
Fluminense FC players
Associação Atlética Ponte Preta players